The Manila North Cemetery (Spanish: Cementerio del Norte) is one of the oldest cemeteries in Metro Manila, Philippines. It is located alongside Andrés Bonifacio Avenue and borders two other important cemeteries: the La Loma Cemetery and the Manila Chinese Cemetery. Numerous impoverished families notably inhabit some of the mausoleums.

History and Architecture 

The Manila North Cemetery was formerly part of La Loma Cemetery but was separated as an exclusively Catholic burial ground. The cemetery formerly known as Cementerio del Norte was laid out in 1904.

The cemetery in its entirety was once called Paang Bundok, the area National Hero Jose Rizal selected as his final resting place. The current Paang Bundok is now a barangay located before the cemetery grounds.

During the Japanese occupation of the Philippines in World War II the cemetery became the site of atrocities, with accounts that Imperial Japanese forces led by General Tomoyuki Yamashita brutally killed more than 2,000 unarmed noncombatants in the cemetery from October to November 1944.

The cemetery being one of the oldest cemeteries in the metropolis is evident on the different designs of mausoleums that reflect the prevailing architectural style in the Philippines during the period they were constructed. The styles range from simple, plain-painted with a patch of greenery, to very complex designs that contain reliefs that are difficult to carve while also having different colors.

Informal settlement
Many people already live inside the cemetery with some of them serving as caretakers of the mausoleums where they also stay to survive. When the families or owners of the mausoleums come, especially during and after All Soul's Day, the families transfer to other places. In addition, the informal settlers often serve as informal tour guides, bringing visitors to tombs of famous people and discussing the oral history of the area. Others take advantage of the quantity of visitors during the Allhallowtide holiday, setting up stalls to sell drinks and snacks, and providing visitors other services like renting out their toilets.

Clearing operations made in 2019 destroyed the shanties and other obstructions inside the cemetery, displacing the families who lived in the makeshift homes and in the mausoleums.

Heritage Structures

Bautista-Nakpil Pylon 
The Bautista-Nakpil Pylon at the North Cemetery was designed by Juan Nakpil as a tribute to both Bautista and Nakpil families, including his uncle and benefactor, Dr. Ariston Bautista. The funerary pylon is a tall, square podium which has four human figures on the top corners that form a gesture of prayer capping off the tall columns. The frontal side is embellished by geometricized flowers, spiraling foliage, and nautilus shells in low-relief concrete panels which has a highly decorated stoup on the lower portion. An octagonal lantern-like form sits on top of the podium with miniature columns buttressing on all sides and crowned by a rigid dome.

Mausoleum of the Veterans of the Revolution 

The Mausoleum of the Veterans of the Revolution is a memorial dedicated to Filipino revolutionaries of the Philippine Revolution and the Philippine–American War.

Notable burials 
The remains of key figures in Philippine history are buried in the cemetery. Most of the people have their tombs on the main avenue of the cemetery while other notable people are located near the main entrance. Some of them are:
 Arcadio Arellano (1872–1920), architect
 Iggy Arroyo (1950–2012), former congressman of Negros Occidental (2004–12)
 Ladislao Bonus (1854–1908), Father of the Philippine Opera
 José Corazón de Jesús (1896–1932), poet known as Huseng Batute. Lyricist of the famed protest anthem Bayan Ko
 Tomas Cloma (1904–1996), president of the Philippine Maritime Institute (now PMI Colleges). Interred in a mausoleum shaped like a ship, titled SS Last Voyage
 Mariano Jesús Cuenco (1888–1964), 4th President of the Senate of the Philippines
 Doña Narcisa Buencamino vda. de León  (1877–1966), Founder and matriarch of LVN Pictures, Inc.
 Manuel Earnshaw (1862–1936), former resident commissioner to the US Congress
 Isauro Gabaldon (1875–1942), former senator and resident commissioner to the US Congress
 Pedro Guevara (1879–1938), former senator and resident commissioner to the US Congress
 Francis Burton Harrison (1873–1957), former American governor-general
 Amado Hernández (1903–1970), labor leader, Philippine literary icon and National Artist for Literature
 Atang de la Rama-Hernández (1905–1991), wife of Amado, kundiman singer, actress, and National Artist for Theater and Music
 Félix Resurrección Hidalgo (1853–1913), painter
 Pilar Hidalgo-Lim (1893–1973), one of the founders of Girl Scouts of the Philippines
 Arsenio Lacson (1912–1962), former Manila mayor
 Benito Legarda y Tuason (1853–1915), vice-president of the Malolos Congress and first resident commissioner of the Philippines to the US Congress
 Alfredo Lim (1929–2020), former Manila mayor, NBI Director, DILG Secretary and senator
 Justo Lukban (1863–1927), Major of the Philippine Revolution and the Philippine–American War. Member of the Malolos Congress. Third Mayor of Manila
 Tomas Morato (1887–1965), mayor of Calauag, Quezon, then first appointed mayor of Quezon City. His wife Consuelo Eclavea Morato is also buried with him
 Juan Nakpil (1899–1986), National Artist for Architecture
 Román Ongpin (1847–1912), businessman, philanthropist, nationalist, and civic citizen
 Quintin B. Paredes (1884–1973), former House Speaker and senator
 Carmen Planas (1914–1964),  first woman to be elected to any public office in the Philippines, former Vice mayor and former councilor of Manila
 Claro M. Recto (1890–1960), former senator and Spanish-language author
 Saturnina Rizal Mercado de Hidalgo (1850–1913), sister of Jose Rizal. Interred in the Ver-Hidalgo-Rizal Mausoleum.
 Lucia Rizal (1857–1919), sister of Jose Rizal. Interred in the Herbosa Mausoleum.
 Owen Robyns-Owen, Chief Officer, British Merchant Navy (died: January 9, 1945, at the age of 67), is the only British Commonwealth war grave in the cemetery
 José E. Romero (1897–1978), former representative of Negros Oriental, senator, first Philippine ambassador to the United Kingdom, and Secretary of Education. His second wife, Elisa Zuñiga Villanueva (1910–1999), is also buried with him
 Epifanio de los Santos (1871–1928), historian and former statesman. EDSA, is named after him
 Hilarion "Larry" Silva (1937–2004), comedian and politician
 Andres Solomon (also known as "Tugo" or "Togo") (1905–1952), actor
 Trinidad Tecson (1848–1928), revolutionary nurse
 Lilian Velez (1924–1948), singer-actress of the mid and late 1940s and dubbed as the singing sweetheart of Philippine movies, who was murdered by her co-actor, Narding Anzures on June 26, 1948
 Pancho Villa (1901–1925), a boxer, the first Asian Flyweight World Champion
 Antonio Villegas (1928–1984), former Manila mayor. Formerly buried in Reno, Nevada
 Teodoro Yangco (1861–1939), former resident commissioner to the United States Congress and businessman for whom Yangco Market is named
 Joaquin "Buwaya" Fajardo (1940s–1991), actor
 Rodolfo Boy Garcia (1935–1997), actor
 Rod Navarro (1930–2003), actor
 Asiong Salonga (1924–1951), gangster
 Renato "Porky" Gomez (1948–2009), comedian
 Max Alvarado (1929–1997), actor
 Max Laurel (1944–2016), actor
 Jose Katigbak (1879–1916), engineer and first Filipino student of the renowned Harvard University in Cambridge, Massachusetts
 Patricia Mijares (1923–2012), actress
 Shalala (1960–2021), comedian and TV/radio personality
 Moody Diaz (1930s–1995), actress
 Victor Lopez Jr. (1950–1985), barangay chairman of Tondo, Manila
 Col. Joe Pring (1942–1994), police officer and biological father of actress Joyce Pring
 Fred Elizalde (1907–1979), musician, composer, conductor, bandleader and president of the Manila Broadcasting Company
 Jose Ma. Basa (1839–1907), patriot and propagandist
 Metring David (1920–2010), comedian
 Rudy Meyer (1937–2009), actor
 Bentot Sr. (1920–1986), actor
 Bentot Jr. (1970–2016), actor
 Chiquito (1932–1997), actor and comedian
 Dr. Alberto I. Vasquez (1962–2021), Dentist
 Heneral Guillermo Masangkay (1867–1963), Friend and Adviser of Gat Andres Bonifacio, One of the first member of Katipunan and revolutionary general in Filipino-American War. Buried in his family plot.
 Josefa V. Mendoza (1954–2020), Barangay Chairwoman of Malate, Manila (2007–2018)
 River Nasino (2020), infant baby whose death, funeral, and burial caused controversy in the Philippines.

 Unmarked graves 
 Macario Sakay (1878 –1907), Filipino Revolutionary General. Buried in an unmarked grave after his execution in the Old Bilibid Prisons.
 28 victims of Asociacion De Damas De Filipinas fire tragedy on December 3, 1998. Buried in unmarked graves.

 Group and Family plots 

Mousoleo de los Veteranos de la Revolución

A memorial and national monument dedicated to Filipino revolutionaries of the Philippine Revolution of the 1890s and the Philippine–American War. Notable burials in this monument were:
 Juan Arevalo, patriot, son of Bonifacio Flores Arevalo, assembly member (Declaration of Philippine Independence, Cavite-Viejo, Province of Cavite, June 12, 1898)
 Adriano Hernández (1870–1925), Brigadier General of the Philippine Revolution and Military Strategist and the local hero of Dingle, Iloilo.
 Fernando Canon – Filipino revolutionary general, poet, inventor, engineer, musician
 Pío del Pilar (1865–1931), Philippine revolutionary figure.

29 Martyrs of World War II Memorial

This memorial serves as the final resting place of twenty-nine Manila residents that the Japanese Army executed on August 30, 1944. The remains of the executed individuals were said to be located and identified by their compatriots after the war, after a Japanese-American officer (working in the Japanese Army as a spy), revealed what he had seen and the location of the grave after the executions. Their remains were interred in this mausoleum on March 9, 1947. Notable burials in this plot were:
 Manuel Arguilla (1911–1944), Ilokano writer in English, patriot, and martyr, known for his widely anthologized short story "How My Brother Leon Brought Home a Wife"
 Jose Fortich Ozamiz (1898–1944), former senator and first provincial governor of Misamis Occidental
 Rafael "Liling" R. Roces Jr. (1912–1944), Filipino journalist, writer, patriot, World War II spy, hero, and martyr

Osmeña Family Plot
 Sergio Osmeña (1878–1961), former 4th president of the Philippines.
 Esperanza Limjap-Osmeña (1894–1978), former First Lady of the Philippines

Roxas Family Plot
 Manuel A. Roxas (1892–1948), former 5th president of
the Philippines
 Trinidad Roxas (1899–1995), former First Lady of the Philippines
 Gerardo "Gerry" Roxas, Sr. (1924–1982), former senator
 Gerardo A. Roxas, Jr. (1960–1993), former representative of Capiz, son of Gerardo Roxas Sr.

Magsaysay Family Plot

 Ramon Magsaysay (1907–1957), former 7th president of the Philippines.
 Luz Banzon Magsaysay (1914–2004), former First Lady of the Philippines
 Genaro Magsaysay (1924–1978), former Senator of the Philippines and Representative of the Zambales

Bautista-Nakpil Family Plot

 Ariston Bautista Lin, Filipino physician, philanthropist, and patriot.
 Gregoria de Jesús-Nakpil (1875–1943), wife of Andrés Bonifacio, later wife of Julio Nakpil
 Julio Nakpil (1867–1960), composer, father of Juan Nakpil.

Roces Family Mausoleum
 Alejandro Roces Sr. (1875–1943) – newspaper publisher, "Father of Philippine Journalism"
 Joaquin "Chino" Roces (1913–1988) – nationalist, newspaper publisher, and freedom fighter during the reign of Martial law under Ferdinand Marcos.

Poe Family Mausoleum

 Fernando Poe, Sr. (1916–1951), film producer, director, actor
 Fernando Poe, Jr. (Ronald Allan K. Poe) (1939–2004), National Artist for Film, and 2004 presidential candidate
 Susan Roces (Jesusa Purificacion Levy Sonora-Poe) (1941–2022), actress and wife of Fernando Poe, Jr.
 Andy Poe (1943–1995), actor and brother of Fernando Poe Jr.
 Conrad Poe (1948–2010),  actor and half-brother of Fernando Poe Jr.

Other Group plots and memorials
 American Association plot
 Armed Forces of the Philippines Cemetery
 Boy Scout Cenotaph (in memory of the 24 Boy Scouts who died on board United Arab Airlines Flight 869 en route to the 11th World Scout Jamboree)
 Firemen's plot
 Jewish Cemetery
 Masonic burial grounds
 Military and police plot
 Thomasites' plot
 Veterans of Foreign Wars plot

 Former interments 
 María Agoncillo–Aguinaldo (1879–1963), wife of Emilio Aguinaldo. Her tomb once occupied the center of the Mousoleo de los Veteranos de la Revolución, but was exhumed and reburied at the Aguinaldo Shrine in Kawit, Cavite
 Melchora Aquino (1812–1919), also known as Tandang Sora and Mother of Katipunan. Formerly buried at Mousoleo de los Veteranos de la Revolución, was later exhumed and reburied to Himlayang Pilipino. Remains transferred to the Tandang Sora National Shrine in Quezon City
 Francisco Rizal Mercado (1818–1898) and Teodora Alonso Realonda (1827–1911), parents of José Rizal. Remains were later transferred to Museo ni José Rizal Calamba on January 4, 1997
 Paciano Rizal (1852–1930), oldest brother of José Rizal. Remains were later transferred to Los Baños, Laguna in 1985
 Trinidad Rizal (1868–1951) and Josefa Rizal (1865–1945), sisters of José Rizal. Remains were later transferred to Los Baños, Laguna in 1985
 Narcisa Rizal (1852–1939), sister of José Rizal. Her remains and the remains of the rest of her family were exhumed and transferred to Los Baños, Laguna in 2013
 Marcelo H. del Pilar (1850–1896), Philippine author and propagandist. Formerly buried at the Mausoleo de los Veteranos de la Revolución under the name Plaridel, was later exhumed and reburied in his house in Marcelo H. del Pilar Shrine Bulacan, Bulacan
 Manuel L. Quezon (1878–1944), Former President Commonwealth Government (1935–1944). Formerly buried at Arlington National Cemetery (buried from 1944 to 1946). Transferred to Quezon Memorial Shrine in 1979
 Aurora Quezón (1888–1949), Former First Lady of the Philippines, wife of Manuel Quezon. Transferred to Quezon Memorial Shrine in 2005
 Pedro Paterno (1857–1911), 2nd Prime Minister of the Philippines under the First Republic. Formerly buried at the Manila North Cemetery; his remains were later transferred at San Agustin Church
 Emilio Jacinto (1875–1899), patriot, the Brains of the Katipunan. Formerly buried in Sta. Cruz, Laguna and was later exhumed and reburied at the Mausoleo de los Veteranos de la Revolución. Remains transferred to Himlayang Pilipino, Quezon City in 1975.
 Licerio Geronimo (1855–1924), Revolutionary general. Initially buried at the Mausoleo de los Veteranos de la Revolución, his remains were then reinterred in the base of the Licerio Geronimo Memorial located in Rodriguez, Rizal on February 20, 1993
 Mariano Noriel (1864–1915), Filipino general who fought during the Philippine Revolution and the Philippine–American War. Formerly buried at the Mausoleo de los Veteranos de la Revolución
 Isabelo delos Reyes (1864–1938), politician, labor union activist, and a founder of the Iglesia Filipina Independiente. Formerly buried at the Manila North Cemetery and was later exhumed and reburied in the Maria Clara Church of the Iglesia Filipina Independiente in Manila.
 Dick Israel (1947–2016), movie and television actor, formerly of ABS-CBN and Viva Films; his remains along with his wife Marilyn Michaca (1947–2016) were later transferred to the Enternal Gardens Memorial Park

Popular culture 
 The Museum Foundation of the Philippines and Carlos Celdran's Walk This Way both used to hold walking tours the Chinese Cemetery, North Cemetery and La Loma Cemetery.
 Manila North Cemetery and Chinese Cemetery have a trove of funerary architecture. Mausoleums are designed to look like Chinese pagodas, Hindu Shikhara temples, Egyptian pyramids guarded by Sphinxes, Greek- and Roman-inspired temples, Romanesque-type churches, even Art Deco mausoleums.
 The Manila North Cemetery was the plot setting for the episode 'Paa' of the 2010 horror film Cinco.
 The Manila North Cemetery is where the movie Tombstone Pillow was shot. Tombstone Pillow stars Filipina actress Lourdes Duque Baron. It is directed by Dream Team Directors and musical score was done by Hagay Mizrahi who is known as one of the sound engineers for Justin Bieber. Said film reaped several prestigious nominations and awards abroad namely, Winner for Best Short Drama at the ICP Entertainment Short Film Series, official finalist at the Asian Cinematography Awards, New York City Independent Film Festival, LA Shorts International Film Festival, and the NYCIFF Festival. Tombstone Pillow movie highlights the plight of 6,000 impoverished Filipinos living in the Manila North Cemetery.

See also
 Marcos Museum and Mausoleum
 Quezon Memorial Circle
 La Loma Cemetery
 Manila Chinese Cemetery
 Libingan ng mga Bayani
 Manila American Cemetery and Memorial
 Manila South Cemetery
 Scouting memorials

References

External links

 Cemeteries are a time capsule of RP history, culture
 CWGC: Manila North Cemetery

Cemeteries in Metro Manila
Landmarks in the Philippines
Mausoleums used as housing
Buildings and structures in Santa Cruz, Manila
Commonwealth War Graves Commission cemeteries in the Philippines